The Hot Zone is an American anthology drama television series, based on the 1994 non-fiction book of the same name by Richard Preston and airing on National Geographic.

The first season, consisting of six episodes, aired from May 27 to May 29, 2019, and was intended as a miniseries. Largely set in 1989, it follows U.S. Army scientist Nancy Jaax who is confronted the possibility of a potentially deadly outbreak of Ebola. Jaax, a veterinary pathologist, first identifies the ebolavirus after it appears in monkeys in a Primate Quarantine Facility in the suburbs of Washington, D.C.  The season was positively reviewed, and renewed for a second season.

The second season, titled The Hot Zone: Anthrax, focuses on the 2001 anthrax attacks, just weeks after September 11. The season, also consisting of six episodes, aired from November 28 to November 30, 2021.

Cast and characters

Season one

Main 
Julianna Margulies as Col. Nancy Jaax, an Army veterinary pathologist
Noah Emmerich as Col. Jerry Jaax, an Army veterinary surgeon
Liam Cunningham as Wade Carter
Topher Grace as Dr. Peter Jahrling, a virologist
James D'Arcy as Travis Rhodes

Recurring 
Paul James as Ben Gellis
Nick Searcy as Frank Mays
Robert Wisdom as Col. Vernon Tucker
Robert Sean Leonard as Walter Humboldt
Grace Gummer as Melinda Rhodes
Lenny Platt as Capt. Kyle Ormond

Season two

Main 
Tony Goldwyn as Bruce Edwards Ivins, a microbiologist whose assistance with the FBI draws attention to himself as a suspect in the 2001 anthrax attacks.
Daniel Dae Kim as Matthew Ryker, an FBI agent specializing in microbiology, who fears other types of attacks will follow those of September 11.

Recurring 
Harry Hamlin as Tom Brokaw
Dylan Baker as Ed Copak, a senior FBI agent
Ian Colletti as Chris Moore, a new FBI agent
Dawn Olivieri as Dani Toretti, an FBI behaviorist
Denyce Lawton as Sheila Willis, a pharmaceutical lobbyist and Ryker's girlfriend
Morgan Kelly as Eric Sykes, an FBI agent

Episodes

Series overview

Season 1 (2019)

Season 2: Anthrax

Production

Development 
On April 18, 2018, it was announced that National Geographic had given a series order to the production. Executive producers were set to include Lynda Obst, Kelly Souders, Brian Peterson, Jeff Vintar, and Ridley Scott. Production companies involved with the series were slated to consist of Fox 21 Television Studios, Scott Free Productions, and Lynda Obst Productions. On August 9, 2018, it was announced that Kelly Souders and Brian Wayne Peterson were joining the series as showrunners, executive producers, and writers. On February 8, 2019, it was announced that the series would premiere on May 27, 2019. In November 2020, National Geographic renewed the series for a second season.

Casting 
On July 25, 2018, it was announced during the Television Critics Association's annual summer press tour that Julianna Margulies had been cast in the first season's lead role. On September 13, 2018, it was reported that Noah Emmerich, Liam Cunningham, Topher Grace, Paul James, Nick Searcy, Robert Wisdom, and Robert Sean Leonard had joined the cast in starring roles and that James D'Arcy would make a guest starring appearance. On December 6, 2018, it was announced that Grace Gummer would appear in a recurring capacity.

In early 2021, following the announcement of a second season with a different story, Tony Goldwyn, Daniel Dae Kim, Harry Hamlin, Dylan Baker, Ian Colletti Dawn Olivieri, and Denyce Lawton were announced as cast members.

Filming 
Principal photography for the first season took place from September 13, 2018, to November 16, 2018, in Toronto and was also expected to film in South Africa. Exterior photography of the rear loading docks of the "monkey lab" took place at the now-closed Life Savers Factory located at 100 Cumberland Ave, Hamilton, Ontario. Loading docks can be viewed from Burris Street as well as homes in reverse shots. Exterior and interior shots of "Commuter Station" took place at the historic Hamilton Canadian National Railway Station, located at 360 James St N, in Hamilton, Ontario.

Release 
On December 20, 2018, a "first look" still image from the series was released featuring Julianna Margulies in character as Dr. Nancy Jaax. On February 8, 2019, a trailer for the series was released.

The Show airs on National Geographic.

The series is available to stream internationally with Disney+ through its Star hub, with the second season released in selected territories.

Going Viral 
Going Viral is a 2019 one-hour documentary companion to the miniseries.

On February 8, 2019, it was announced that National Geographic had greenlit a companion documentary film to premiere alongside the series in May 2019. The film was set to be executive produced by Betsy Forhan and feature interviews with subjects including Richard Preston, Dr. Nahid Bhadelia, Dr. Anthony S. Fauci, Dr. Pardis Sabeti, and Dr. Ian Crozier. The production company involved with the film was slated to be National Geographic Studios.

Reception

Critical response 
Rotten Tomatoes gave an approval rating of 85%, based on 20 reviews. Its critical consensus reads: "An anxiety-producing dramatization of real-world events, The Hot Zone acts as a sobering reminder of exactly how deadly a disease can be." On Metacritic, the season had a score of 69 out of 100, based on 12 reviews, indicating "generally favorable reviews".

Accolades

Notes

References

External links 

2010s American anthology television series
2010s American drama television series
2019 American television series debuts
Anthrax in fiction
Ebola in popular culture
English-language television shows
National Geographic (American TV channel) original programming
Television series about the Federal Bureau of Investigation
Television series about viral outbreaks
Television series by 20th Century Fox Television
Television series by Scott Free Productions
Television shows based on non-fiction books
Television shows set in Africa
Television shows set in Maryland
Television shows set in Virginia
Television shows filmed in Hamilton, Ontario
Television shows filmed in South Africa
Television shows filmed in Toronto